Brian Stacy Drahman (born November 7, 1966) is a former right-handed baseball pitcher, born in Kenton, Kentucky but raised in Fort Lauderdale, Florida.

Career
He was selected in the second round of the 1986 amateur draft by the Milwaukee Brewers out of Miami-Dade College. He immediately joined the Helena Gold Sox in the Rookie-level Pioneer League, then went 4–6 with a 5.92 earned run average (ERA) over 18 appearances (10 starts). He struck out 40 in 65.1 innings pitched and collected a 1.71 WHIP. Milwaukee promoted him to single-A for the 1987 campaign, with the Midwest League Beloit Brewers. Drahman went 6–5 with a 2.16 ERA in 46 appearances. He had 18 saves and struck out 60 in 79 innings with a 1.08 WHIP.

In 1998, Drahman played high-A level with the Stockton Ports, going 4–5 through 44 relief appearances with a 2.02 ERA and a 1.35 WHIP. He struck out 50 batters in 62.1 innings, but did not earn a promotion, starting the following season again with the Ports. He went 3–2 in a dozen appearances with a 3.25 ERA before earning a callup to the AA level, for the El Paso Diablos in the Texas League. He went 3–4 and his ERA ballooned to 7.26 in 19 relief appearances. With the Brewers needing a veteran fifth starter for its pennant drive, he was dealt to the Chicago White Sox for Jerry Reuss at the trade deadline on July 31, 1989. Drahman was sent back to the A+ level, and played with the Sarasota White Sox in the Florida State League. He went 0–1 over seven games, with a 3.24 ERA.

Drahman joined the Birmingham Barons in the double-A level Southern League for the 1990 campaign, spending the entire season with the club. He had a 6–4 record over 50 games (49 in relief), along with a 4.08 ERA and a 1.26 WHIP, striking out 72 in 90.1 innings pitched. In 1991, he opened the season with the White Sox. He blew a save in his first appearance then gave up five earned runs in 0.2 innings his next time out before settling down to earn a win on April 21. In that contest, he struck out one and allowed no hits or walks in the ninth before Lance Johnson hit a walk-off single in the bottom half for a 5–4 win over the Detroit Tigers. Overall, he played 28 games for the Sox, going 3–2 with a 3.23 ERA and a 1.109 WHIP, striking out 18 in 30.2 innings.

"I didn't have a stellar season", Drahman told the Sun-Sentinel in 1991, "but I did prove I can pitch at the major-league level and that was important."

He also played part of the season with the Vancouver Canadians, going 2–3 with a 4.44 ERA in 22 games. He earned 12 saves, striking out 17 batters in 24.1 innings.

In 1992, Drahman spent most of his season with the Vancouver club in the Pacific Coast League as that team's closer. He went 2–4 with a 2.01 ERA and 30 saves. He appeared 48 times, earning 34 strikeouts in 58.1 innings with a 1.29 WHIP. He also briefly played with the Sox, earning a 2.57 ERA over seven innings in five relief appearances. He played most of the following campaign with the Nashville Sounds in the American Association, going 9–4 with a 2.91 ERA and 20 saves. Over 54 games, he earned a 1.400 WHIP and struck out 59 in 55.2 innings. He also pitched 5.1 innings for Chicago, allowing no earned runs and striking out three. The Florida Marlins purchased his contract directly following the 1993 season.

In 1994, Drahman played with the Edmonton Trappers, Florida's triple-A affiliate in the Pacific Coast League. He went 3–2 with 13 saves in 45 games, with a 4.77 ERA and a 1.41 WHIP. He struck out 62 batters in 60.1 innings. He earned a call-up to the Marlins early in June, staying through the beginning of July. He made nine appearances with the Fish, pitching 13 innings in total. In hindsight, all of his playing time was "low leverage." His best showing was on July 2, when he allowed one earned run in three innings of relief work, striking out three in a 5–0 loss to the Atlanta Braves. He earned a 6.23 ERA while with the Marlins, with a 1.62 WHIP and seven strikeouts. It was during this, his last major league season, where Drahman finally exceeded rookie limits.

Although he last played Major League Baseball at 27, Drahman played seven more seasons of competitive ball, between the Charlotte Knights (Marlins, International League, 21 games, 2–1, 6.30, 1.950), the Oklahoma City 89ers (Texas Rangers, American Association, 22 games, 2–2, 3.09, 1.56), Indianapolis Indians (Cincinnati Reds, 5 games, 0-0, 4.50, 1.875), the Las Vegas Stars (San Diego Padres, Pacific Coast League, 42 games, 3–1, 5.33, 1.69), the Allentown Ambassadors (unaffiliated, Northeast League, 24 games, 11–9, 4.25, 1.388), and the Dos Laredos Tecolotes (unaffiliated, Mexican League, 29 games, 7–9, 3.72, 1.300). Drahman is currently the pitching coach for the Great Falls Voyagers.

References

External links
, or The Baseball Cube
Retrosheet 
Pura Pelota Venezuelan Professional Baseball League statistics

1966 births
Living people
Allentown Ambassadors players
American expatriate baseball players in Canada
American expatriate baseball players in Mexico
Baseball players from Fort Lauderdale, Florida
Baseball players from Florida
Beloit Brewers players
Birmingham Barons players
Caribes de Oriente players
American expatriate baseball players in Venezuela
Charlotte Knights players
Chicago White Sox players
Edmonton Trappers players
El Paso Diablos players
Florida Marlins players
Gary SouthShore RailCats coaches
Helena Gold Sox players
Indianapolis Indians players
Las Vegas Stars (baseball) players
Major League Baseball pitchers
Mexican League baseball pitchers
Minor league baseball coaches
Minor league baseball managers
Nashville Sounds players
Oklahoma City 89ers players
Sarasota White Sox players
Stockton Ports players
Tecolotes de los Dos Laredos players
Vancouver Canadians players
American expatriate baseball players in Taiwan
Uni-President Lions players